A wavefront sensor is a device for measuring the aberrations of an optical wavefront. Although an amplitude splitting interferometer such as the Michelson interferometer  could be called a wavefront sensor, the term is normally applied to instruments that do not require an unaberrated reference beam to interfere with. They are commonly used in adaptive optics systems, lens testing and increasingly in ophthalmology. 

There are several types of wavefront sensors, including:

Shack–Hartmann wavefront sensor
Phase-shifting Schlieren technique
Wavefront curvature sensor
Pyramid wavefront sensor
Common-path interferometer
Foucault knife-edge test
Multilateral shearing interferometer
Ronchi tester
Shearing interferometer

See also 
Adaptive optics
Deformable mirror
Wavefront

External links 
AO Tutorial: Wave-front Sensors
Wavefront sensing: Establishments Research groups and companies with interests in wavefront sensing and adaptive optics.
Observational astronomy
Optical instruments